Schumann is a German occupational surname. Notable people with the name, in English often Schuman, include:

In athletics 
 Desirée Schumann (born 1990), German goalkeeper
 Manfred Schumann (born 1951), German bobsledder
 Margit Schumann (1952–2017), German luger
 Nils Schumann (born 1978), German athlete
 Ralf Schumann (born 1962), German champion 25 m Rapid Fire Pistol shooter

In music 
 Clara Schumann (née Wieck, 1819–1896), German pianist and composer; wife of Robert Schumann
 Coco Schumann (1924–2018), German jazz musician
 Elisabeth Schumann (1888–1952), German opera soprano
 Ernestine Schumann-Heink (1861–1936), opera singer
 Georg Schumann (composer) (1866–1952), German composer and director
 John Schumann (born 1953), Australian singer, songwriter, guitarist, formerly in Redgum
 Melissa Schuman (born 1984), American singer and actress
 Peter Schumann (born 1934), theater director
 Robert Schumann (1810–1856), German composer
 Tom Schuman (born 1958), American jazz musician
 Walter Schumann (1913–1958), American soundtrack composer
 William Schuman (1910–1992), American composer

In politics 
 Alfred O. Schumann (1924–2013), American politician
 Conrad Schumann (1942–1998), East German soldier who defected to the West
 Georg Schumann (resistance fighter) (1886–1945), German Communist and resistance fighter against the Nazis
 Dr. Horst Schumann (1906–1983), German Nazi SS-Sturmbannführer, participated in criminal medical experiments at Auschwitz
 John C. Schuman (1881–1971), American politician and farmer
 Marvin C. Schumann (1906-1994), American politician
 Maurice Schumann (1911–1998), French politician
 Robert Schuman (1886–1963), French politician and a founding father of the European Union

In science 
 Erich Schumann (1898–1985), German physicist
 Howard Schuman (born 1928), American sociologist
 Karl Moritz Schumann (1851–1904), German botanist
 Winfried Otto Schumann (1888–1974), German physicist who predicted the Schumann resonance

In other fields 
 Allan L. Schuman (born 1934), businessman
 Patricia G. Schuman (born 1943), American librarian and publisher
 Paul R. Schumann (1876–1946), American painter
 Scott Schuman (blogger), creator of the fashion blog The Sartorialist

German-language surnames
Occupational surnames